William Elisha Haynes (October 19, 1829  – December 5, 1914) was an American Civil War veteran who served two terms as a U.S. Representative from Ohio from 1889 to 1893. He was a cousin of George William Palmer.

Early life and career 
Born in Hoosick Falls, New York, Haynes moved to Ohio with his parents, who settled in Lower Sandusky (now Fremont) in 1839.
He attended the common schools.
Apprenticed as a printer.

He worked at the Sandusky Clarion and the Cleveland Plain Dealer.

He served as clerk on a steamer on Lake Superior in 1848 and 1849.
He engaged in mercantile pursuits at Fremont 1850–1856.
Auditor of Sandusky County, Ohio from 1856 to 1860.

Civil War
Enlisted in the Union Army as a private April 16, 1861, in the Eighth Regiment, Ohio Volunteer Infantry.
Commissioned captain and served in western Virginia, the Shenandoah Valley, and in the Army of the Potomac until November 1862, when he was commissioned lieutenant colonel of the Tenth Regiment, Ohio Volunteer Cavalry, and served with it in the Army of the Cumberland until 1864, when he was honorably discharged.

Political career 
He served as collector of internal revenue for the ninth district of Ohio in 1866 and 1867.
He again engaged in mercantile pursuits 1866–1873.
He engaged in banking 1873–1914.

He served as delegate to the Democratic National Convention in 1880 and 1884.

Congress 
Haynes was elected as a Democrat to the Fifty-first and Fifty-second Congresses (March 4, 1889 – March 3, 1893).
He declined to be a candidate for renomination in 1892.

Later career and death 
He resumed banking in Fremont, Ohio, in which he continued until his death there on December 5, 1914.
He was interred in Oakwood Cemetery (Fremont, Ohio).
Haynes was married to Maria H. Harmon of Fremont on February 8, 1855. They had children named Julia M., William P., and George W. Haynes.

References

 Retrieved on 2008-11-11

1829 births
1914 deaths
People from Fremont, Ohio
People from Hoosick Falls, New York
People of Ohio in the American Civil War
Union Army officers
Democratic Party members of the United States House of Representatives from Ohio
19th-century American politicians